Jaylon is a unisex given name of Greek origin meaning "calm". It increased in popularity significantly during the 1990s and 2000s, peaking in 2002 as the 823rd most popular English baby name.

Notable people with the given name "Jaylon" include

Jaylon Bather (born 1992), Bermudian footballer
Jaylon Brown (born 1994), American basketball player
Jaylon Ferguson (1995–2022), American football player
Jaylon Hadden (born 1998), Costa Rican footballer
Jaylon Johnson (born 1999), American football player
Jaylon Jones (born 1997), American football player
Jaylon Moore (offensive lineman) (born 1998), American football player
Jaylon Moore (wide receiver) (born 1997), American football player
Jaylon Scott, American basketball player
Jaylon Smith (born 1995), American football player
Jaylon Tate (born 1995), American basketball player

See also
Jalen, a page for people with the given name "Jalen"
Jaylen, a page for people with the given name "Jaylen"

References

English masculine given names
English given names
English unisex given names